Holt's Wharf was a godown terminal in Tsim Sha Tsui, Kowloon, Hong Kong in the 20th century. It was set up in 1910 and jointly owned by British Swire Group and Blue Funnel Line. It was located at the southeast seaside of Tsim Sha Tsui and the south of Signal Hill. Since it was next to Tsim Sha Tsui KCR station, it acted as a railway and freight logistics hub in Hong Kong. 

In 1971, Swire Group and Blue Funnel Line sold the site to New World Development. Two years later in 1973, New World Development commenced the construction of New World Centre and The Regent Hong Kong (renamed the InterContinental Hong Kong since 2001) on the site. Construction was completed in 1982. In 2017, the site renamed to Victoria Dockside.

References

Tsim Sha Tsui
Swire Group
New World Development
Ports and harbours of Hong Kong
Transport infrastructure completed in 1910
1973 disestablishments in Hong Kong
Former buildings and structures in Hong Kong